The 16th Indian Division was an infantry division of the Indian Army during the First World War. It was formed in December 1916, during the First World War. It was the only war formed division of the British Indian Army that was not sent overseas, instead it was sent to guard the North West Frontier. The division took over the responsibilities of the 3rd Lahore Divisional Area when it was disbanded in May 1917.

The 16th Division was called into action for the Waziristan Campaign in 1917, the 45th (Jullundur) Brigade under command of Brigadier Reginald Dyer were responsible for the Jallianwala Bagh massacre. In 1919, they were sent into Afghanistan during the Third Afghan War.

The division was not reformed for the Second World War.

Order of Battle 
The division was composed as follows:

43rd Indian Brigade 

 2/6th Battalion Royal Sussex Regiment
 2nd Battalion 12th Pioneers
 1st Battalion 124th Duchess of Connaught's Own Baluchistan
 1st Battalion 4th Gurkha Rifles

44th (Ferozepore) Brigade 

Joined the division in February 1917:
 1/9th Battalion Hampshire Regiment
 2nd Battalion 17th Infantry
 2nd Battalion 30th Punjabis (Replaced by the 3rd battalion August 1918)

45th (Jullundur) Brigade 
Joined the division in May 1917:
 1/25th Battalion London Regiment
 3rd Battalion 23rd Sikh Pioneers
 55th Coke's Rifles (Frontier Force)
 2nd Battalion 151st Sikh Infantry

In the Third Afghan War the formation was:
 1 Squadron 37th Lancers (Baluch Horse)
 1/25th Battalion London Regiment
 2nd Battalion 41st Dogras
 2nd Battalion 69th Punjabis
 2nd Battalion 150th Infantry
 57th Wilde's Rifles (Frontier Force)
 1 Company 2/4th Battalion Border Regiment
 23rd (Peshawar) Mountain Battery (Frontier Force)

Ambala Brigade 

Joined the division in May 1917:
 1/9th Battalion Middlesex Regiment
 4th Battalion 30th Punjabis

Divisional troops 
 23rd Battalion Rifle Brigade
 2nd Battalion 10th Jats

Divisional Artillery
 VI Brigade, Royal Field Artillery (RFA)
 CCXVII Brigade, RFA
 CCXVIII Brigade, RFA
 CCXXI Brigade, RFA

See also

 List of Indian divisions in World War I

Notes

References

Bibliography

External links
 

British Indian Army divisions
Indian World War I divisions
Military units and formations established in 1916
Military units and formations disestablished in 1922